Agnetina is a genus of common stoneflies in the family Perlidae. There are at least 30 described species in Agnetina.

Species
These 31 species belong to the genus Agnetina:

 Agnetina aequalis (Banks, 1937) c g
 Agnetina annulipes (Hagen, 1861) i c g b (southern stone)
 Agnetina armata (Banks, 1940) c g
 Agnetina brevipennis (Navás, 1912) c g
 Agnetina cadaverosa (McLachlan, 1875) c g
 Agnetina capitata (Pictet, 1841) i c g b (northern stone)
 Agnetina chrysodes Navás, 1919 c g
 Agnetina circumscripta (Klapálek, 1912) c g
 Agnetina cocandica (McLachlan, 1875) c g
 Agnetina curvigladiata Du, Y. & Chou, 1998 c g
 Agnetina den Cao, T.K.T. & Bae, 2006 c g
 Agnetina duplistyla (Wu, C.F., 1962) c g
 Agnetina elegantula (Klapálek, 1905) c g
 Agnetina extrema (Navás, 1912) c g
 Agnetina flavescens (Walsh, 1862) i c g b (midwestern stone)
 Agnetina gladiata (Wu, C.F., 1962) c g
 Agnetina immersa (McLachlan, 1875) c g
 Agnetina jarai Stark & Sivec, 1991 c g
 Agnetina kryzhanovskii Sivec & Zhiltzova, 1997 c g
 Agnetina longihirta Du, Y. & Chou, 1998 c g
 Agnetina multispinosa (Wu, C.F., 1938) c g
 Agnetina navasi (Wu, C.F., 1935) c g
 Agnetina pedata (Koponen, 1949) c g
 Agnetina praeusta (Klapálek, 1912) c g
 Agnetina quadrituberculata (Wu, C.F., 1935) c g
 Agnetina senilis Klapálek, 1921 c g
 Agnetina spinata (Wu, C.F., 1949) c g
 Agnetina starki Du, Y. & Chou, 1998 c g
 Agnetina vietnamica Li, Weihai & G. Wang, 2012 c g
 Agnetina werneri (Kempny, 1908) c g
 Agnetina zwicki Stark & Sivec, 2008 c g

Data sources: i = ITIS, c = Catalogue of Life, g = GBIF, b = Bugguide.net

References

Further reading

External links

 

Perlidae
Articles created by Qbugbot
Insects described in 1948